Procarcelia is a genus of parasitic flies in the family Tachinidae.

Species
Procarcelia brasiliensis Townsend, 1927

Distribution
Brazil.

References

Monotypic Brachycera genera
Diptera of South America
Exoristinae
Tachinidae genera
Taxa named by Charles Henry Tyler Townsend